There is a body of films that feature home invasions. Paula Marantz Cohen says, "Such films reflect an increased fear of the erosion of distinctions between private and public space... These films also reflect a sense that the outside world is more dangerous and unpredictable than ever before." Home invasion films are commonly thrillers and horror films. The home invasion subgenre goes as far back as D. W. Griffith's 1909 film The Lonely Villa.

Note: this list only covers films containing actual or attempted home invasions, and does not include movies based around assaults on other places such as Assault on Precinct 13, which dealt with a police station being invaded, or intrusion under false pretenses, such as Orphan.

List of films

See also
Home Alone (franchise), a series of family comedy films released from 1990 through 2021.

Notes

References

Articles containing video clips
Home

Lists of films by common content